The First Born is a supervillain appearing in American comic books published by DC Comics, commonly as an adversary of the superhero Wonder Woman. Created by Brian Azzarello and Cliff Chiang, the character first appeared in Wonder Woman (vol. 4) #13 (December 2012).

A dark secret held by the elder Gods of Olympus, the First Born was in fact the first born child of Zeus and Hera. On the day of his birth, a prophecy was recited that some day he would sit upon the throne of his father with the rest of the family as corpses around him. To prevent this from coming to pass, Zeus arranged for his infant son's death, but it survived; using its nascent power, it commandeered a pack of hyenas to bring it food. It grew to adulthood, and became strong. For thousands of years the First Born has walked the Earth, trying to earn the love and respect of his distant father while also seeking ways to destroy him.

Fictional character biography
A grotesque and enormous man with cannibalistic tendencies and a muscular body entirely covered in scars, the First Born emerged from ice in Antarctica soon after the God Apollo took over the throne of Olympus, and was soon approached by a group of scientists who were waiting for him to appear. He devoured one of them and started talking with normal human words, after he first only spoke in a strange mysterious language. He claimed to be "the one with no name, the crippler of souls, the First Born", and refused the group attempt to "help him". Subsequent issues later revealed him to be the first born son of Zeus and Hera of Olympus, in a time before recorded history.

On the day of his birth, Zeus had a witch foretell the infant's future. She predicted that Mount Olympus would have been under his sole absolute control, with death and destruction in his wake. As Zeus himself had vanquished his father, and like his father before him, Zeus feared he would share their fate and ordered the witch to kill the infant in spite of Hera's protests. Seeing Hera's desperation, the witch took pity on the infant, and rather than kill him as ordered, she decided to spare his life and only abandoned him on the African plains with a slim chance to survive. Instead of being savaged by the beasts of the plains, the First Born was taken in and raised by a pack of hyenas. Despite never meeting any humans before he reached manhood, the First Born instinctively knew he was the son of Zeus and he spent his days attempting to gain his attention without success by performing feats of strength and savagery.

Having grown to manhood and realized he would never gain the attention of Zeus from the plains, he set his sights on the emerging human world. Together with his pack he created an army of Hyena-men and invaded the human lands with it, eventually coming to control it all, ruling over a barbaric kingdom. Yet still, despite this feat, and what other monsters he threw himself at, Zeus still refused to answer. Finally, the First Born decided that if Zeus would not come to him, he would go to Zeus and lay siege to Mount Olympus itself. He gathered his army before marching it to every corner of his kingdom, demanding two things: join him or die. At last when his army stood before Mount Olympus, the First Born challenged his father and threw a spear at the mountain. In response, Zeus sent a tidal wave that crushed the First Born's army and left the son half drowned. Zeus finally appeared in person before the First Born and condemned him, letting the Earth swallow him, dragging him into its core. After this, only five people knew of the First Born had ever existed: Zeus, Hera who thought him dead, Poseidon who commanded the wave, Hades who received the First Born's army and the witch, who would chronicle the events on her own skin.

Ever since then, the First Born has been clawing his way out of the Earth, which took over seven thousand years. All knowledge of his existence has been erased from history by Zeus, the only account of his story was tattooed across the mummified body of the witch that spared him. The tale had taken most of the lead scientist Cassandra's life, as the body was discovered 80 years ago, and recounted the infant First Born's life story. Since his re-discovery, the First Born first collected his arms and armor, made of a dragon's hide and bones. Then he bargained for his army with Hades and Poseidon, who would be left alone in return along with the death of the Last Born: Zeke.

Wonder Woman and her allies, following an encounter with the goddess Artemis, were unprepared for an encounter with the First Born. They gained the opportunity to flee to New Genesis after Diana's half-brother Lennox sacrificed himself in order to buy the others time. With no way of following them, the First Born laid claim to London and waited 3 days before Diana and her allies would return, only to be defeated at the combined hands of Wonder Woman, Orion and Ares, leaving Ares dead and Diana the new God of War.

Apollo claimed the First Born and attempted to torture him into obedience, only for him to eventually break free and claim Mount Olympus as his own. With his father's throne, the First Born has since been on a campaign to slay the other Olympians, having killed Hades and fed him to Chronos and nearly killed Demeter. He would eventually be poised to invade Themyscira, the homeland of the only one he appears to have some semblance of grudging respect; Wonder Woman, who had  defeated him in the past.

Powers and abilities
As an Olympian god, the First Born possesses sufficient superhuman strength, speed and invulnerability to challenge the likes of Wonder Woman and Orion of the New Gods, and to strangle Ares (once, Greek god of 'War') to death. In one battle, after surviving blows from Orion and Wonder Woman, he was able to pry open a Boom Tube, with his bare hands (a first for the DC Comics Universe), and hold it open for an extended period of time. Despite his extraordinary physical power, First Born uses his divine genius to manipulate or control lesser beings, like his hyena-men, preferring only to engage in direct confrontations with equals or other gods, like Wonder Woman (daughter of Zeus) and the dragon that he slew to get his mystical armor and weapons, which make him seemingly invulnerable to mortal harm. Without his armor, he is impervious enough to crawl through the Earth's crust, unaffected by the heat and immense pressure, and enough to survive a shotgun blast to the head.

Among the First Born's array of godly powers is his telepathic ability to communicate with wildlife, and especially his hyena companions, some of whom he mated with to create his ferocious were-hyena soldiers. He has also displayed his telepathic abilities by sensing the berserker rage in Wonder Woman and goading her into a fight with him.

Upon briefly becoming the King of the Greek gods and of oblivion, the First Born went into battle with the Amazons, naked, in a crown of severed deer antlers and a cloak of dismembered, bloody veins that, at his command, could ensnare his opponents and drain away their life forces. He also had psychokinetic control over the energy and matter of Mount Olympus to transfigure it into a mound of bloody, organic flesh, with giant bones jutting up through it, into the sky.

References

Characters created by Brian Azzarello
Comics characters introduced in 2012
DC Comics characters who can move at superhuman speeds
DC Comics characters with superhuman strength
DC Comics supervillains
DC Comics male supervillains
DC Comics characters who have mental powers
DC Comics telekinetics 
DC Comics telepaths
Fictional characters with disfigurements
Fictional characters with plant abilities
Fictional characters with immortality
Fictional characters with elemental transmutation abilities
Fictional characters with absorption or parasitic abilities
Fictional characters with superhuman durability or invulnerability
Fictional empaths
Wonder Woman characters